The 1925–26 Connecticut Aggies men's basketball team represented Connecticut Agricultural College, now the University of Connecticut, in the 1925–26 collegiate men's basketball season. The Aggies completed the season with an 11–3 overall record. The Aggies were members of the New England Conference, where they ended the season with a 3–1 record. The Aggies played their home games at Hawley Armory in Storrs, Connecticut, and were led by third-year head coach Sumner A. Dole.

Schedule 

|-
!colspan=12 style=""| Regular Season

Schedule Source:

References 

UConn Huskies men's basketball seasons
Connecticut
1925 in sports in Connecticut
1926 in sports in Connecticut